Kari Schanke (August 29, 1922 – July 5, 2006) was a Norwegian politician for the Liberal Party of Norway.

She served as a deputy representative to the Norwegian Parliament from Telemark during the term 1965–1969.

References

1922 births
2006 deaths
Deputy members of the Storting
Liberal Party (Norway) politicians
Women members of the Storting
20th-century Norwegian women politicians
20th-century Norwegian politicians